Hood Kaweesa (born 22 July 1982) is a Ugandan football defender who plays for Police FC. He was a squad member for the 2002 CECAFA Cup.

References

1982 births
Living people
Ugandan footballers
Uganda international footballers
SC Villa players
Uganda Revenue Authority SC players
Victors FC players
Lweza FC players
Police FC (Uganda) players
Buildcon F.C. players
Association football defenders
Ugandan expatriate footballers
Expatriate footballers in Zambia
Ugandan expatriate sportspeople in Zambia
Sportspeople from Kampala